Theodor Geib (15 September 1885 Landau, Palatinate – 26 November 1944) was a German general in Albania during World War II.

Rather than appoint a military governor to oversee Albania, Germany appointed Geib as "German General in Albania" (DGA) with the official duty "to represent the interests of the Wehrmacht to the "Albanian government".

References

Sources 

 
 

1885 births
1944 deaths
German Army personnel killed in World War II
Albania in World War II
German Army generals of World War II
Generals of Artillery (Wehrmacht)
German Army personnel of World War I
Military personnel from Rhineland-Palatinate
People from Landau
Recipients of the German Cross
Recipients of the Iron Cross (1914), 1st class